The superior longitudinal muscle of tongue or superior lingualis is a thin layer of oblique and longitudinal fibers immediately underlying the mucous membrane on the dorsum of the tongue.

Structure 
The superior longitudinal muscle of the tongue is one of the intrinsic muscles of the tongue. It arises from the submucous fibrous layer close to the epiglottis and from the median fibrous septum, and runs forward to the edges of the tongue.

Nerve supply 
The superior longitudinal muscle of the tongue is supplied by the hypoglossal nerve (CN XII).

Function 
The superior longitudinal muscle of the tongue works with the other intrinsic muscles to move the tongue.

References 

Muscles of the head and neck
Tongue